Protoplasman is a Big Bang Comics superhero, who first appeared in Big Bang's self-published issue, Big Bang Presents #1, though his metafictional debut was in Policeman Comics (A tribute to Police Comics, where Plastic Man debuted), itself a division of Quantity Comics (a pastiche of Quality Comics), created by writer Gary Carlson and artist Mort Todd.

Fictional character biography
Protoplasman is the comic-relief superhero of the Big Bang world, who works closely with Knight Watchman either as a partner or as an assistant. Although his powers are sometimes described as elasticity, that appears to be false information. When using his powers, Protoplasman seems to take on a liquid-like form, suggesting that his powers are derived from fluidity, rather than elasticity.

Since Big Bang Comics began self-publishing, Protoplasman has become a favourite with fans, with a sense of humor derived from Plastic Man (on whom he was based) and the zany attitude of Canadian actor Jim Carrey.

A collection of the Protoplasman comics was released in Spring 2009 called All-Protoplasman Color Cavalcade #1, co-published by Big Bang Comics and Comicfix.

References
 http://www.comicvine.com/big-bang-comics-mighty-man-and-the-critter-crime-wave/37-121224/
 http://www.internationalhero.co.uk/p/protoplasman.jpg
 Big Bang Present # 1
 http://www.comicvine.com/protoplasman/29-61081/

Image Comics superheroes
Big Bang Comics